Puglisi is an Italian surname, derived from , the Sicilian language term to indicate someone from Apulia. Notable people with the surname include:

 Andy Puglisi, American boy who disappeared in 1976
 Claudio Puglisi, Italian football referee
 Gemma Puglisi, Italian-American author
 Leonardo Puglisi, Australian journalist
 Marcello Puglisi, Italian racing driver
 Onofrio Puglisi (d. 1679), Sicilian mathematician
 Pino Puglisi, Roman Catholic priest

Italian-language surnames